The Monastery of St. Dimitrios is a former Eastern Orthodox monastery that is part of the Meteora monastery complex in Thessaly, central Greece.

In 1809, the Albanian Ottoman pasha Ali Pasha Tepelena destroyed the monastery, since Greek insurgents led by the local klepht leader Thymios Vlachavas were hiding at the site. Today, the monastery ruins can be seen on Dimitrios Rock. Ypapantis Monastery is located on the same rock, below the Monastery of St. Dimitrios.

Access
A trail leads up to the base of the rock from the main unpaved road below. The monastery ruins can only be reached by climbing the rock.

References

Meteora